The Pandoh Dam is an embankment dam on the Beas River in Mandi district of Himachal Pradesh, India. Under the Beas Project, the dam was completed in 1977 and its primary purpose is hydroelectric power generation. The water is used for power generation at the Dehar Power House before being discharged into the Sutlej River, connecting both rivers. The power house has an installed capacity of 990 MW. The system diverts 256 cumecs  (9000 cusecs) of Beas waters to the Satluj River. The project was completed in 1977.

History 
The two major rivers  Beas and Satlej flow out of the himalayas and reach a point where they are separated by a crow fly distance of approximately 36 km and have an elevation difference of approximately 1099 ft. The waters of Beas flow from melting ice throughout the year. This was realized and a plan made to exploit the potential of this river system. The power potential was estimated as 1,000 MW. The plans originally called Beas Project Unit - I Beas Satluj Link Project went through several revisions for diverting the waters of Beas river. The first plan prepared by Punjab Irrigation Department in 1957. The 1957 plan contemplated a diversion dam at Pandoh,  tunnel,  open channel,  tunnel. The 1957 report was followed by a 1960 report and the final proposal in 1961. The system would divert  of the Beas to the Satluj. An added benefit of the project was the increased inflow to Gobind Sagar thereby increasing power generation capacity at Bhakra Dam and added irrigation waters for the states of Punjab and Haryana. The project was approved in 1963 and commissioned in 1977.

Components 

The seven components of the Dehar hydroelectric Project for diversion of 9000 cusecs of water and power generation as shown on the figures are:
 Pandoh dam - 76.25 m (250 ft) earthen dam
 Pandoh Baggi Tunnel -  7.62 m dia, 13.11 km long
 Sundernagar Hydel Channel - 11.8 km long open channel
 Sundarnagar Dehar Tunnel - 8.53 m dia,  12.53 km long 
 Surge Shaft - 22.86 m dia x 125 m high
 Penstocks - Three 4.877 m split to six 3.353 m
 Dehar Power House - 6 × 165 MW

Pandoh Dam

The dam was commissioned in 1977 and its primary purpose is hydroelectric power generation. The water is used for power generation at the Dehar Power House before being discharged into the Satluj River, connecting both rivers.

Pandoh Lake 

Operation 
It splits into three 4.877 m dia followed by six 3.353 m dia penstocks before reaching the power house. The 22.86 m dia 125 m tall surge shaft at the end of the tunnel is designed to take any backfow due to sudden shutdown of the power plant and avoid tunnel rupture due to water hammer.

Dehar Power Plant
The Dehar Power Plant  is situated on the banks of the Satluj at the Slapper bridge. Water from penstocks is fed into a six 165 MW Francis turbine-generator and then discharged in the Satluj.

It is managed by the Bhakra Beas Management Board (BBMB), which is engaged in regulation of the supply of water and power from Bhakra Nangal Dam and Beas Projects to the states of Punjab, Haryana, Rajasthan, Himachal Pradesh and Delhi.

Diverted waters from Beas also increased the generation capacity of the Bhakra Dam downstream of Dehar Power Plant.

Ecology 
The Pandoh dam diverts 256 cumecs (9000 cusecs) of Beas to river Satluj.  Diversion of the Beas water has done considerable damage to the towns downstream on Beas river and left a trail of misery to Mandi. In winter the river bed almost dries and leaves a deserted look.

See also

Bhakra Dam – downstream of Dehar Power Station

References

Dams completed in 1977
Energy infrastructure completed in 1977
Dams in Himachal Pradesh
Hydroelectric power stations in Himachal Pradesh
Run-of-the-river power stations
Dams on the Beas River
1977 establishments in Himachal Pradesh
Buildings and structures in Mandi district
20th-century architecture in India